Tangday, also known as Tanday, (Tañdai, تاڭداي; , Tanday) is a town in Atyrau Region, west Kazakhstan.

References

Atyrau Region
Cities and towns in Kazakhstan